The Nathan Loeb House is a house located in northwest Portland, Oregon, that is listed on the National Register of Historic Places. It features stained glass windows by the Povey Brothers.

See also
 National Register of Historic Places listings in Northwest Portland, Oregon

References

Houses on the National Register of Historic Places in Portland, Oregon
Houses completed in 1893
Queen Anne architecture in Oregon
1893 establishments in Oregon
Northwest Portland, Oregon
Portland Historic Landmarks
Individually listed contributing properties to historic districts on the National Register in Oregon